HHI may refer to:

 Fraunhofer Institute for Telecommunications (also Fraunhofer Heinrich Hertz Institute), an organization of the Fraunhofer Society based in Berlin
 Hamburg International (ICAO code: HHI), an independent passenger airline based in Hamburg-Nord, Hamburg, Germany
 Harvard Humanitarian Initiative, an interfaculty Harvard University initiative dedicated to advancing research, practice, and policy in the field of humanitarian assistance
 Henry Henderson Institute, an educational establishment in Blantyre, Malawi
 Herfindahl–Hirschman index, a measure of the size of firms in relation to the industry they are in
 Hildesheim Hauptbahnhof (DS100 code: HHI), the main railway station for the city of Hildesheim in Lower Saxony, Germany
 Hillcrest Heights Institute, a private school located in the barangay of San Francisco, Magalang, Pampanga
 Hoia Hoia language (ISO 639-3 code: hhi), a Papuan language of Papua New Guinea
 Hopewell Highway Infrastructure, the highway unit of Hong Kong-listed conglomerate Hopewell Holdings Ltd
 Hyundai Heavy Industries, the world's largest shipbuilding company
 Wheeler Army Airfield (IATA code: HHI), a United States Army post located on O'ahu